Mats Staub (born 1972, Muri near Berne, Switzerland) is a Swiss artist. He lives and works in Berlin as well as wherever his long-term projects take him. His projects have been presented all over the world, including Künstlerhaus Mousonturm Frankfurt, Kaserne Basel, Theaterhaus Gessnerallee Zurich, Théâtre de Vidy Lausanne, The Berne Museum of Communication, the Theaterformen Festival in Hannover/Braunschweig, the Wiener Festwochen, the Adelaide Festival, the Bienal de Arte Mediales in Santiago de Chile and the South African International Documentary Festival Encounters in Cape Town.

Biography 
Mats Staub studied theatre, journalism and religious studies in Berne, Fribourg and Berlin. He worked as a dramaturg at Theater Neumarkt in Zurich (2002–2004), before beginning to create his own artistic projects which critics have situated between theatre and exhibition, research, journalism and literature.

Staub's work is concerned with memory, life stories and far-reaching biographical experiences. They invite the participants to reflect on their pasts and to formulate these reflections and memories from a specific perspective - be it with a number (Holidays), in interviews with Staub himself (My Grandparents, 21 - Memories of Growing Up), in conversation with a partner (Death and Birth In My Life), or in writing (Ten Important Events In My Life/ Diez moments en mi vida).

His projects have led Staub to make interviews and recordings all around the world. For his audio installation My Grandparents (2008-2013), he talked to over three hundred people in fourteen cities about what they remember about their grandparents. In the video installation 21 – Memories of Growing Up he has portrayed members of different generations in the process of remembering the time when they were 21 years old. His online collection Ten Important Events In My Life, comprising around 3000 events, was also published as a book (Salis Verlag, 2014) and was continued as a site-specific as well as museum exhibition in Spain and Latin America as Diez moments en mi vida (2017-2019). Staub continuously expands his long-term projects by making new lists, portraits, conversations wherever one of his installations is presented. Thus, every project constitutes a growing archive of conversations and oral history from different countries, in different languages, often spanning several generations.

Staub has worked with different formats: besides his audio and video installations with online collections (Ten Important Events In My Life), books, site-specific audio walks (Bundesplatz and Metzgergasse) as well as exhibitions in museums and in public space (Diez momentos en mi vida).

His projects have been invited to festivals such as the Wiener Festwochen (2006, 2009, 2015), the Adelaide Festival (2018) and the Edinburgh Festival Fringe (2019).

Works 

Death and Birth in My Life, long-term project since 2019
21- Memories of Growing Up, long-term project since 2012
Artist (working title), 2018
Diez momentos en mi vida, 2017-2019
When Did You Stop Being a Child?, 2016
My Other Life, long-term project since 2015
Werdegänge (Winterthur), 2013-2017
Ten Important Events In My Life, 2012-2015
The Names of Love, 2012
Bundesplatz, 2012
Metzgergasse, 2011-2013
Holidays, 2010-2012
My Grandparents, 2008-2013
5000 Love Letters, 2004-2006

Publications 
 Meine Grosseltern. My Grandparents, Edition Patrick Frey, 2010 Hardcover, 192 Seiten, 115 S/W-Abbildungen, 15.7 × 22 cm ISBN Nummer: 978-3-905509-94-6
 Zehn wichtigste Ereignisse meines Lebens, Salis Verlag, 2014 Broschur, 396 Seiten, 11.5 x 17 cm
 "Leben – Erzählen – Zeigen. Gedanken zum Umgang mit dem Biographischen im künstlerischen Werk von Mats Staub." In: Krankenhagen, S. & Vahrson, V. (Hg.) Geschichte kuratieren. Kultur- und kunstwissenschaftliche An-Ordnungen der Vergangenheit. Köln, Weimar, Wien: Böhlau Verlag, 2017

References

External links 

 Warum wir uns erinnern, wenn wir vergessen, in: SRF, Sternstunde Philosophie, 26 January 2014
 Talking heads: the Kosovo war, life in the Hitler youth and the trials of turning 21, in: The Guardian, 12.03.2018
 Der Zuhörer – er sammelt Geschichten, die ihm wildfremde Menschen erzählen, in: bz Basel, 06.06.2019
 The art of human connection, in: CityMag Adelaide, 15.02.2018
 Die Galerie der hörenden Menschen, in: PublikForum, 31.05.2013
 Ich möchte kein Hitparadendenken, in: Tages-Anzeiger, 13.03.2013
 In den Kinderschuhen der Grossjährigkeit, in: Der Standard, 18.05.2015

Swiss installation artists
Swiss male artists
1972 births
Living people